Kamesarahdih is a Hamlet of Dildarnagar Kamsar located in Ghazipur District of Uttar Pradesh, India. Kamesaradih is the main and a histrorical place of Dildarnagar Kamsar from where Kamsaar Pathans imerged and got their name Kamsaar. Kamesaradih have a kot which was built by Raja Narhar Khan in 1542s. The kot present in Kamesaradih is know under Archaeological Survey of India.

References 

Villages in Ghazipur district